Matt Frey is a musician from Huntington Beach, CA. He was born in Anaheim, CA. He is currently the touring keyboardist for the Nickelodeon act Big Time Rush. He was a member in the short-lived LA quartet, Polus as well as Las Vegas group, Parade of Lights. He has performed with Thirty Seconds to Mars in various European cities and at the My Coke Fest in South Africa. Most recently he completed the Better with U Tour as a member of the Big Time Rush Backing Band.

Selected discography
with Polus
Wish EP

with Parade of Lights
Parade of Lights EP
"Just Like Falling In Love"

Select videography
Parade of Lights: "Just a Little" 
Polus: "The Edge"

External links
 Thirty Seconds To Mars | Listen and Stream Free Music, Albums, New Releases, Photos, Videos
 Parade of Lights | Listen and Stream Free Music, Albums, New Releases, Photos, Videos
 CD Baby Music Store

References

Living people
1986 births
21st-century American keyboardists
21st-century American male musicians
Musicians from Anaheim, California
People from Huntington Beach, California